The 2013 Elon Phoenix football team represented Elon University in the 2013 NCAA Division I FCS football season. They were led by third-year head coach Jason Swepson and played their home games at Rhodes Stadium. They were a member of the Southern Conference. This was their final season as a member of the SoCon as they joined the Colonial Athletic Association in 2014. They finished the season 2–10, 1–7 in SoCon play to finish in a tie for eighth place.

On November 25, 2013 Jason Swepson was fired after 3 consecutive losing records with a compiling record a 10–24 in those three seasons.

Preseason outlook
The Elon Phoenix began the season with four players named to the preseason All-Southern Conference teams:  Linebacker Jonathan Spain was joined by second-team selections Clay Johnson for offensive line, Kierre Brown as a wide receiver, and defensive back Chandler Wrightenberry.  The team began the season picked next to last in the conference.

In May 2013, the school announced that the program will be leaving the Southern Conference to join the Colonial Athletic Association in 2014 as an all-sports member.  The 2013 football season was their last season in the Southern Conference.

Media
Every Elon game will be broadcast on WPCM AM 920. Select games will be streamed online by ESPN3.

Schedule

Schedule source:

References

Elon
Elon Phoenix football seasons
Elon Phoenix football